The 1914 European Figure Skating Championships were held on February 8 in Vienna, Austria. Elite figure skaters competed for the title of European Champion in the category of men's singles. These were the last European Championships in Figure Skating before World War I.

Results

Men

Judges:
 Otto Bohatsch 
 Karl Kaiser 
 Emanuel Hajek 
 Hans Pfeiffer 
 Herbert R. Yglesias

References

Sources
 Result List provided by the ISU

European Figure Skating Championships, 1914
European Figure Skating Championships
European Figure Skating Championships
International figure skating competitions hosted by Austria
European Figure Skating Championships
1910s in Vienna
Sports competitions in Vienna